Nathaniel Phillips Smith Thomas (November 17, 1844 – May 12, 1890) was an American politician.

Thomas, son of Allen M. and Charlotte P. (Smith) Thomas, was born in Wickford, Rhode Island, November 17, 1844. Before entering Yale College he served as Commodore's Aid in the United States Navy. After graduation in 1868 he began the study of law in Providence, but soon went to the Law School of Columbia College, where he completed the course in May, 1870. His professional career began in Minneapolis, but in 1873 he returned to Wickford to reside, and opened the same year a law-office in Providence, where he continued until his death. He built up a good law business, and also took a prominent part in State politics. He was elected to the Rhode Island General Assembly in 1874, and again in 1875, and from 1874 to 1879 was Clerk of the Rhode Island State Senate ; he was also for many years Secretary of the Republican State Central Committee. From 1879 to 1889 he was one of the State Commissioners of Shell Fisheries, and gave much time and study to that work. For more than two years he had been a sufferer from angina pectoris, and during a visit to Europe last January he was seriously ill with la grippe and pneumonia, from which he never fully recovered. He died suddenly at his home in Providence, May 12, 1890, in his 46th year. He was unmarried.

References

External links
 

1844 births
1890 deaths
Yale College alumni
Columbia Law School alumni
Minnesota lawyers
Rhode Island lawyers
Members of the Rhode Island General Assembly
19th-century American politicians
19th-century American lawyers